Alfredo Noel Iusem (born 10 November 1949, in Buenos Aires) is an Argentine-born Brazilian mathematician working on mathematical optimization.

He earned his Ph.D. from Stanford University in 1981 under the supervision of George Bernard Dantzig.

He is a recipient of Brazil's National Order of Scientific Merit in mathematics. Since 2001, he has been a member of the Brazilian Academy of Sciences.

Regina Burachik was a student of his at Instituto Nacional de Matemática Pura e Aplicada.

Selected publications 
with R. S. Burachik: "A generalized proximal point algorithm for the variational inequality problem in a Hilbert space", SIAM Journal on Optimization.
with R. S. Burachik and B. F. Svaiter: "Enlargement of monotone operators with applications to variational inequalities", Set-Valued Analysis and Variational Analysis.
with B. F. Svaiter and Marc Teboulle: "Entropy-like proximal methods in convex programming", Mathematics of Operations Research.

References 

Living people
Brazilian mathematicians
1949 births
Stanford University alumni
Recipients of the National Order of Scientific Merit (Brazil)
Members of the Brazilian Academy of Sciences
People from Buenos Aires
Argentine emigrants to Brazil
Instituto Nacional de Matemática Pura e Aplicada researchers